Selene Colburn is an American politician currently serving in the Vermont House of Representatives from the Chittenden-6-4 district since 2017 as a member of the Vermont Progressive Party. Prior to her tenure in the State House she served on the city council in Burlington, Vermont. She is the first female chair of the House Progressive Caucus.

Colburn was born in Burlington, and educated at Burlington High School, Bennington College, and Simmons University. She became active in politics in her youth when she joined anti-war demonstrations.

Colburn was first elected to office with her election to the Burlington city council in the 2014 election and she won reelection in the 2015 and 2017 elections. She was elected to the state house alongside Brian Cina in the 2016 election with the nominations of the Progressive and Democratic parties and was reelected in the 2018 and 2020 elections. She was selected to serve as assistant chair of the Vermont Progressive Party's caucus in the state house and then to serve as chair.

Early life

Selene Colburn was born in Burlington, Vermont. She participated in anti-war demonstrations as a teenager in the 1980s. She graduated from Burlington High School in 1987. Colburn graduated from Bennington College with a Bachelor of Arts in dance in 1991, and graduated with a master's degree in library and information science from Simmons University.

Career

Local politics

Colburn was elected to the Burlington city council to succeed Kevin Worden with the nomination of the Vermont Progressive Party in the 2011 election without opposition after Democratic nominee Molly Loomis dropped out. During the campaign she had raised $3,055 and spent $2,049. She was redistricted into the East district and defeated Democratic nominee Carmen Scoles in the 2015 election. She did not run for reelection in the 2017 election and was succeeded by Democratic nominee Richard Deane.

She served as Rachel Siegel's campaign manager when Siegel ran for a seat on Burlington's city council. Carina Driscoll won the endorsement of the Vermont Progressive Party during the 2018 Burlington mayoral election after Colburn nominated Driscoll for the party's endorsement. During the 2019 election she served as Jack Hanson's campaign treasurer for his city council campaign. She served as city councilor Jack Hanson's campaign treasurer during the 2021 election. Colburn endorsed Max Tracy, the Progressive nominee, during the 2021 Burlington mayoral election.

Vermont House of Representatives

Representatives Chris Pearson, a member of the Progressive Party, and Kesha Ram, a member of the Democratic Party, declined to run for reelection to the Vermont House of Representatives in 2016. Colburn ran for a seat in the state house from the Chittenden-6-4 district in the 2018 election with the nominations of the Democratic and Progressive parties and won in the general election alongside Brian Cina. During the campaign she was endorsed by Senator Bernie Sanders. She and Cina were reelection in the 2018 and 2020 elections.

During the 2020 session of the state house Colburn served as assistant chair of the Vermont Progressive Party's caucus in the state house. In 2020, she was selected by an unanimous vote of seven to serve as chair of the Vermont Progressive Party's caucus in the state house while Emma Mulvaney-Stanak was selected to serve as assistant chair. She is the first woman to lead the Vermont Progressive Party's caucus in the state house.

Political positions

Colburn introduced legislation in the state house to make all single occupancy restrooms gender neutral which was passed by the state legislature and signed into law by Governor Phil Scott. She introduced legislation in the state house to decriminalize prostitution.

The city council voted six to five, with Colburn in favor, in favor of a non-binding resolution encouraging employees of the Howard Center to be paid a living wage. The state house voted 89 to 58, with Colburn in favor, in favor of raising the minimum wage and creating a paid family leave program. She and Representatives Diana Gonzalez and Cina wrote an open letter calling for at least twenty percent of Vermont's police budget to be diverted to other services.

Electoral history

References

21st-century American politicians
21st-century American women politicians
Bennington College alumni
Living people
Democratic Party members of the Vermont House of Representatives
Simmons University alumni
Vermont Progressive Party politicians
Women state legislators in Vermont
Year of birth missing (living people)